Tough Talk is the fourth album by The Jazz Crusaders, recorded in 1963 and released on the Pacific Jazz label.

Reception

AllMusic rated the album with 4 stars; in his review, Scott Yanow said: "In the 1960s the Jazz Crusaders managed to be both accessible and creative, funky and swinging, traditional (with the influence of R&B and gospel) yet modern; no wonder the group was so popular in the jazz world".

Track listing 
 "Deacon Brown" (Wilton Felder) - 3:40
 "Turkish Black" (Felder) - 5:34
 "Brahms' Lullaby" (Johannes Brahms) - 4:42
 "Boopie" (Felder) - 4:17
 "Tough Talk" (Wayne Henderson, Joe Sample) - 2:20
 "No Name Samba" (Felder) - 2:25
 "Lazy Canary"  (Henderson) - 4:15
 "Lonely Horn" (Felder) - 3:53
 "Brother Bernard" (Sample) - 4:23

Personnel 
The Jazz Crusaders
Wayne Henderson - trombone
Wilton Felder - tenor saxophone
Joe Sample - piano, harpsichord
Bobby Haynes - bass
Stix Hooper - drums

References 

The Jazz Crusaders albums
1963 albums
Pacific Jazz Records albums